During the 1994–95 English football season, Tranmere Rovers F.C. competed in the Football League First Division.

A reconstructed Prenton Park was opened in March 1995, with the all seater stadium now holding just under 17,000 supporters.

Season summary
In the 1994–95 campaign, Tranmere missed out on promotion via the play-offs for a third consecutive season after losing to Reading in the semi-finals. A reconstructed Prenton Park was opened in March 1995, with the all seater stadium now holding just under 17,000 supporters.

Final league table

Results
Tranmere Rovers' score comes first

Legend

Football League First Division

First Division play-offs

FA Cup

League Cup

Anglo-Italian Cup

Squad

References

Tranmere Rovers F.C. seasons
Tranmere Rovers